Genesis is the fifth studio album by American rapper Busta Rhymes. The album was released on November 27, 2001, by Flipmode Records and J Records. The fourth single from the album, "Pass the Courvoisier Part II", peaked at number eleven on the Billboard Hot 100. It was included at the end of the album on some later pressings (on which "Ass On Your Shoulders" was removed due to playing time restrictions). The album debuted at number 7 on the Billboard 200 with first-week sales of 185,000 copies. It later sold 1 million domestic copies and certified Platinum by RIAA.

Track listing
Credits adapted from the album's liner notes.

Sample credits
Samples adapted from liner notes.
 "As I Come Back" contains replayed elements from "Scenario (Remix)" by A Tribe Called Quest featuring Leaders of the New School.
 "Shut 'Em Down" contains elements from "Shut 'Em Down (Pete Rock Remix)", written by Hank Shocklee, Carlton Riddenhour, and Gary Rinaldo, performed by Public Enemy.
 "Betta Stay Up in Your House" contains elements from "Eddie You Should Know Better", written and performed by Curtis Mayfield.
 "Pass the Courvoisier" contains re-sung elements from:
 "Shake Ya Ass", written by Michael Tyler, Pharrell Williams, and Chad Hugo.
 "Easy Come, Easy Go", written by Sandy Linzer and Denny Randell.
 "Rapper's Delight", written by Bernard Edwards and Nile Rodgers.
 "Scenario", written by James Jackson, Trevor Smith, Bryan Higgins, Kamaal Farreed, Ali Shaheed Muhammad, and Malik Taylor.
 "Break Ya Neck" contains replayed elements from "Give It Away", written by Flea, John Frusciante, Anthony Kiedis, and Chad Smith.
 "Wife In Law" contains re-sung elements from "A Woman Needs Love (Just Like You Do)", written and performed by Ray Parker Jr.

Charts

Weekly charts

Year-end charts

Certifications

References

External links

2001 albums
Busta Rhymes albums
Albums produced by the Neptunes
Albums produced by Dr. Dre
Albums produced by Battlecat (producer)
Albums produced by Nottz
Albums produced by Just Blaze
Albums produced by J Dilla
Albums produced by Pete Rock
J Records albums